The non-marine molluscs of Brazil are a part of the molluscan fauna of Brazil.

There are at least 1,074 native nominal species of non-marine molluscs living in Brazil. 

There are at least 956 nominal species of gastropods, which breaks down to about 250 species of freshwater gastropods, and about 700 species of land gastropods (590 species of snails and approximately 110(?) species of slugs), plus at least 117 species of bivalves living in the wild.

There are at least 373 species of freshwater molluscs in Brazil.

The number of native species is at least 1,074 and the number of non-indigenous molluscs in Brazil is, at minimum, 32 species. The most serious invasive alien species in Paraná State are the land snail Achatina fulica and the freshwater snail Melanoides tuberculata.

In Rio Grande do Sul, 201 species and subspecies of non-marine mollusks were recorded: 156 gastropods (83 land snails + 18 slugs + 55 freshwater snails) and 45 bivalves.

In Santa Catarina, 158 species and subspecies of non-marine mollusk were recorded: 135 gastropods (103 land gastropods + 32 freshwater snails) and 23 bivalves.

Freshwater gastropods
The following list of freshwater gastropods is based on the two southernmost states.

Ampullariidae

Pleuroceridae
 Doryssa schuppi (Ihering, 1902)

Cochliopidae
 Atomicus inopinatus Simone & Rolán, 2021
 Heleobia apua Simone & Rolán, 2021
 Heleobia australis (d’Orbigny, 1835)
 Heleobia bertoniana Pilsbry, 1911
 Heleobia brucutu Simone & Oliveira, 2021
 Heleobia charruana d’Orbigny, 1843
 Heleobia cuzcoensis (Pilsbry, 1911)
 Heleobia davisi (Silva & Thomé, 1985)
 Heleobia iguassu Simone, 2021
 Heleobia nana Marcus & Marcus, 1963
 Heleobia parchappei (d’Orbigny, 1835)
 Heleobia piscium (d’Orbigny, 1835) – synonyms: Littoridina (= Heleobia) piscium (= australis) (d’Orbigny, 1835)
 Heleobia pukua Simone & Rolán, 2021
 Heleobia robusta Silva & Veitenheimer-Mendes, 2004

Tateidae
 Potamolithus catharinae Pilsbry, 1911
 Potamolithus jacuhyensis Pilsbry, 1899
 Potamolithus mirim Simone, 2021
 Potamolithus phillippianus Pilsbry, 1911
 Potamolithus ribeirensis Pilsbry, 1911
 Potamolithus troglobius

Pomatiopsidae
 Idiopyrgus souleyetianus Pilsbry, 1911
 Spiripockia punctata Simone, 2012

Thiaridae
 Melanoides tuberculata (Müller, 1774)

Planorbidae

Chilinidae
 Chilina fluminea (d’Orbigny, 1835)
 Chilina globosa Frauenfeld, 1881
 Chilina megastoma Hylton Scott, 1958
 Chilina parva Martens, 1868
 Chilina rushii Pilsbry, 1896

Physidae
 Aplexa marmorata (Guilding, 1828) – Aplexa (Stenophysa) marmorata
 Aplexa rivalis (Maton & Rackett, 1807)
 Physa acuta Draparnaud, 1805 – synonym: Physa cubensis

Lymnaeidae
 Pseudosuccinea columella (Say, 1817)
 Lymnaea rupestris Paraense, 1982
 Lymnaea viatrix (d’Orbigny, 1835)

Land gastropods
The listing of land snails is complete for snails based on Saldago (2003). The slug listings are probably incomplete because they are based on list from two southernmost states only.

Helicinidae (complete)

Neocyclotidae (complete)
 Neocyclotus agassizi (Bartsch & Morrison, 1942)
 Neocyclotus amazonense (Bartsch & Morrison, 1942)
 Neocyclotus blanchetianus (Moricand, 1836)
 Neocyclotus brasiliensis (Gray, 1839)
 Neocyclotus currani (Bartsch & Morrison, 1942)
 Neocyclotus fultoni (Bartsch & Morrison, 1942)
 Neocyclotus hedui (Bartsch & Morrison, 1942)
 Neocyclotus inca (d’Orbigny, 1835)
 Neocyclotus incomptus (Sowerby, 1850)
 Neocyclotus merrilli (Bartsch & Morrison, 1942)
 Neocyclotus moricandi (Pfeiffer, 1852)
 Neocyclotus prominulus (d’Orbigny, 1835)
 Neocyclotus redfieldi (Bartsch & Morrison, 1942)
 Neocyclotus stramineus (Reeve, 1843)

Diplommatinidae (complete)
 Adelopoma brasiliense
 Adelopoma paraguayana Parodiz, 1944
 Habeas corpus Simone, 2013
 Habeas data Simone, 2013
 Habeas priscus Simone, 2013

Vertiginidae (complete)
 Gastrocopta iheringi (Suter, 1900)
 Gastrocopta oblonga
 Gastrocopta servilis – subspecies Gastrocopta servilis oblonga (Pfeiffer, 1853)
 Gastrocopta solitaria

Pyramidulidae
 Pyramidula compacta Suter, 1900

Valloniidae (complete)
 Vallonia pulchella
 Pupisoma dioscoricola (Adams, 1845)
 Pupisoma minus Pilsbry, 1920
 Strobilops brasiliana

Succineidae (complete)
 Succinea burmeisteri Döring
 Succinea lopesi Lanzieri, 1966
 Succinea manaosensis Pilsbry, 1926
 Succinea meridionalis d’Orbigny, 1837
 Succinea pusilla Pfeiffer, 1849
 Succinea repanda Pfeiffer, 1854
 Oxyloma beckeri Lanzieri, 1966
 Omalonyx brasiliensis (Simroth, 1896)
 Omalonyx convexa (Martens, 1868)
 Omalonyx unguis (d’Orbigny, 1837)

Ellobiidae
 Melampus coffeus (Linnaeus, 1758)
 Pedipes mirabilis (Mohlfeld, 1816)

Achatinidae
 Achatina fulica (Bowdich, 1822)

Charopidae (complete)
 Radiodiscus bolachaensis Fonseca & Thomé, 1995
 Radiodiscus cuprinus Fonseca & Thomé, 2000
 Radiodiscus iheringi (Ancey, 1899)
 Radiodiscus patagonicus (Suter, 1900)
 Radiodiscus promatensis Miquel, Ramírez & Thomé, 2004
 Radiodiscus thomei Weyrauch, 1965
 Radiodiscus vazi Fonseca & Thomé, 1995
 Radioconus amoenus (Thiele, 1927)
 Radioconus costellifer Hylton-Scott, 1957
 Radioconus goeldii (Thiele, 1927)
 Ptychodon amancaezensis (Hidalgo, 1869)
 Ptychodon liciae (Vaz, 1991)
 Ptychodon janeirensis (Thiele, 1927)
 Ptychodon schuppi (Suter, 1900)
 Rydleya quinquelirata (Smith, 1890)
 Trochogyra gordurasensis (Thiele, 1927)
 Trochogyra leptotera Rochebrune & Mabille, 1882
 Trochogyra pleurophora (Moricand, 1846)
 Trochogyra superba (Thiele, 1927)
 Zilchogyra zulmae Miquel, Ramírez & Thomé, 2004

Helicodiscidae (complete)
 Zilchogyra clara (Thiele, 1927)
 Zilchogyra deliciosa (Thiele, 1927)
 Zilchogyra paulistana (Hylton-Scott, 1973)
 Lilloiconcha gordurasensis (Thiele, 1927)
 Lilloiconcha tucumana (Hylton-Scott, 1963)
 Helicodiscus thereza Thiele, 1927

Punctidae (complete)
 Paralaoma servilis (Shuttleworth, 1852)
 Punctum pilsbyi (Hylton-Scott, 1957)

Zonitidae (complete)
 Oxychilus cellarius (Müller, 1774)
 Oxychilus nitidus (Müller, 1774)
 Oxychilus sublenticularis (Böttger, 1889)
 Zonitoides arboreus (Say, 1816)
 Zonitoides parana Baker, 1914

Veronicellidae
 Belocaulus angustipes (Heynemann, 1885)
 Belocaulus willibaldoi Ohlweiler, Mota & Gomes, 2009
 Phyllocaulis renschi Thomé, 1965
 Phyllocaulis boraceiensis Thomé, 1976
 Phyllocaulis soleiformis (d’Orbigny, 1835)
 Phyllocaulis tuberculosus (Martens, 1868)
 Phyllocaulis variegatus (Semper, 1885)
 Sarasinula dubia (Semper, 1885)
 Sarasinula linguaeformis (Semper, 1885)
 Sarasinula marginata (Semper, 1885)
 Sarasinula plebeia (Fischer, 1868)
 Vaginulus taunayi Férussac, 1821

Milacidae
 Milax cf. gagates (Draparnaud, 1801)
 Milax valentianus Férussac, 1821

Limacidae
 Limax maximus Linnaeus, 1758
 Limacus flavus

Agriolimacidae
 Deroceras laeve (Müller, 1774)

Philomycidae
 Pallifera sp.

Euconulidae (complete)
 Habroconus angueinus (Ancey, 1892) – synonym: Habroconus angüinus (Ancey, 1892)
 Habroconus goyazensis (Ancey, 1901)
 Habroconus martinezi (Hidalgo, 1869)
 Habroconus mayi (Baker, 1914)
 Habroconus semenline Moricand, 1846 – synonym: Habroconus (Pseudoguppya) semenlini (Moricand, 1845)
 Euconulus fulvus (Müller, 1774)
 Guppya sp.

Ferussaciidae (complete)
 Cecilioides blandiana (Crosse, 1880)
 Cecilioides consobrina (d’Orbigny, 1841)
 Cecilioides gundlachi (Pfeiffer, 1850)

Discidae
 Discus alternatus (Say, 1816)

Subulinidae (complete)

 Subulina octona (Bruguière, 1789)
 Subulina parana Pilsbry, 1906
 Leptinaria bequaerti Pilsbry, 1926
 Leptinaria charlottei Baker, 1923
 Leptinaria concentrica (Reeve, 1849)
 Leptinaria lamellata (Potiez & Michaud, 1838)
 Leptinaria mamoreensis Baker, 1926
 Leptinaria monodon (C. B. Adams, 1849)
 Leptinaria parana Pilsbry, 1926
 Leptinaria ritchiei Pilsbry, 1907
 Leptinaria unilamellata (d’Orbigny, 1835)
 Lamellaxis gracilis (Hutton, 1834)
 Lamellaxis micra (d’Orbigny, 1835) – synonym: Allopeas micra (d’Orbigny, 1835)
 Opeas beckianum (Pfeiffer, 1846)
 Opeas goodalli (Miller, 1822)
 Opeas octogyrum (Pfeiffer, 1856)
 Opeas opella Pilsbry & Vanatta, 1906
 Rumina decollata (Linnaeus, 1758)
 Synapterpes coronatus (Pfeiffer, 1846)
 Synapterpes hanleyi (Pfeiffer, 1846)
 Obeliscus agassizi Pilsbry, 1906
 Obeliscus carphodes (Pfeiffer, 1852)
 Obeliscus columella (Philippi, 1844)
 Obeliscus obeliscus (Moricand, 1833)
 Obeliscus pattalus Pilsbry, 1906
 Obeliscus planospirus (Pfeiffer, 1852)
 Obeliscus sylvaticus (Spix, 1827)
 Obeliscus subuliformis (Moricand, 1836)
 Neobeliscus calcareus (Born, 1778)
 Vegrandinia trindadensis (Breure and Coelho, 1976) – synonym: Bulimulus trindadensis Breure & Coelho, 1976

Megaspiridae (complete)
 Callionepion iheringi Pilsbry & Vanatta, 1899
 Megaspira elata (Gould, 1847)
 Megaspira elatior (Spix, 1827)
 Megaspira iheringi Pilsbry, 1926
 Megaspira ruschenbergiana Jay, 1836

Oleacinidae (complete)
 Euglandina irakita Jardim, Abbate & Simone, 2013
 Euglandina striata

Strophocheilidae (complete)

Orthalicidae (complete include subfamilies according to the Bouchet & Rocroi, 2005)

Simpulopsidae
 Rhinus gilbertus Simone & Casati, 2013

Odontostomidae
 Clinispira insolita Simone & Casati, 2013
 Anostoma tessa Simone, 2012
 Cyclodontina capivara Simone & Casati, 2013
 Pilsbrylia dalli Simone, 2018

Bulimulidae

Scolodontidae (complete)
 Scolodonta amazonica (Dohrn, 1882)
 Scolodonta bounoboena (d’Orbigny, 1835)
 Scolodonta interrupta (Suter, 1900)
 Scolodonta mutata (Gould, 1846)
 Scolodonta nitidula (Dohrn, 1882)
 Scolodonta spirorbis (Deshayes, 1850)
 Systrophia eatoni Baker, 1914
 Systrophia siolii Haas, 1955
 Entodina cheilostropha (d’Orbigny, 1835)
 Entodina derbyi (Ihering, 1912)
 Entodina exigua (Thiele, 1927)
 Entodina jekylli Baker, 1914
 Entodina lundi (Mörch, 1871)
 Drepanostomella sp.
 Wayampia sp.
 Happia ammoniformis (d’Orbigny, 1835)
 Happia ammonoceras (Pfeiffer, 1854)
 Happia besckei (Dunker, 1847)
 Happia euspira (Pfeiffer, 1854)
 Happia grata Thiele, 1927
 Happia iheringi (Clessin, 1888)
 Happia insularis (Böttger, 1889)
 Happia microdiscus Thiele, 1927
 Happia mülleri Thiele, 1927
 Happia pilsbryi Lange-de-Morretes, 1949
 Happia snethlagei Baker, 1914
 Happia vitrina (Wagner, 1827)
 Miradiscops brasiliensis (Thiele, 1927)
 Tamayops banghaasi (Thiele, 1927)

Streptaxidae (complete)
 Huttonella bicolor (Hutton, 1834) – First report in 2008.
 Martinella prisca Thiele, 1927
 Rectartemon apertus (Martens, 1868)
 Rectartemon candidus (Spix, 1827)
 Rectartemon cappilosus (Pilsbry, 1897)
 Rectartemon cryptodon (Moricand, 1851)
 Rectartemon depressus (Heynemann, 1868)
 Rectartemon helios (Pilsbry, 1897)
 Rectartemon hylephilus (d’Orbigny, 1835)
 Rectartemon intermedius (Albers, 1857)
 Rectartemon mulleri (Thiele, 1927)
 Rectartemon politus (Fulton, 1899)
 Rectartemon rollandi (Bernardi, 1857)
 Rectartemon spixianus (Pfeiffer,1841)
 Rectartemon wagneri (Pfeiffer, 1841)
 Hypselartemon alveus (Dunker, 1845)
 Hypselartemon contusulus (Férussac, 1827)
 Hypselartemon deshayesianus (Crosse, 1863)
 Hypselartemon paivanus (Pfeiffer, 1867)
 Streptaxis contusus (Férussac, 1821)
 Streptaxis decussatus Pilsbry, 1897
 Streptaxis dunkeri Pfeiffer, 1845
 Streptaxis iguapensis Pilsbry, 1930
 Streptaxis iheringi Thiele, 1827
 Streptaxis lutzelburgi Weber, 1925
 Streptaxis pfeifferi (Pilsbry, 1930)
 Streptaxis piquetensis (Pilsbry, 1930)
 Streptaxis regius Lobbecke, 1881
 Streptaxis saopaulensis Pilsbry, 1930
 Streptaxis subregularis Pfeiffer, 1846
 Streptaxis tumulus Pilsbry, 1897
 Streptaxis uberiformis Pfeiffer, 1848
 Streptartemon abunaensis (Baker, 1914)
 Streptartemon candeanus (Petit, 1842)
 Streptartemon comboides (d’Orbigny, 1835)
 Streptartemon cookeanus (Baker, 1914)
 Streptartemon crossei (Pfeiffer, 1867)
 Streptartemon cumingianus (Pfeiffer, 1849)
 Streptartemon decipiens (Crosse, 1865)
 Streptartemon deformis (Férussac, 1821)
 Streptartemon dejectus (Petit, 1842)
 Streptartemon deplanchei (Drouet, 1859)
 Streptartemon elata (Moricand, 1846)
 Streptartemon extraneus Haas, 1955
 Streptartemon glaber (Pfeiffer, 1849)
 Streptartemon molaris Simone & Casati, 2013
 Streptartemon quixadensis (Baker, 1914)
 Streptartemon streptodon (Moricand, 1851)
 Sairostoma perplexum Haas, 1938

Camaenidae (complete)
 Polygyratia polygyrata (Born, 1778)

Pleurodontidae (complete)
 Labyrinthus furcillatus (Hupé, 1853)
 Labyrinthus raimondii (Philippi, 1867)
 Labyrinthus yatesi (Pfeiffer, 1855)
 Solaropsis amazonica (Pfeiffer, 1854)
 Solaropsis anguicula (Hupé, 1853)
 Solaropsis bachi Ihering, 1900
 Solaropsis brasiliana (Deshayes, 1831)
 Solaropsis cearana (Baker, 1914)
 Solaropsis cicatricata Beck, 1837
 Solaropsis derbyi (Ihering, 1900)
 Solaropsis elaps Dohrn, 1882
 Solaropsis fairchildi Bequaert & Clench, 1938
 Solaropsis feisthameli (Hupé, 1853)
 Solaropsis heliaca (d’Orbigny, 1835)
 Solaropsis johnsoni Pilsbry, 1933
 Solaropsis leopoldina (Strubel, 1895)
 Solaropsis pascalia (Cailliaud, 1857)
 Solaropsis pilsbryi Ihering, 1900
 Solaropsis rosarium (Pfeiffer, 1849)
 Solaropsis rugifera Dohrn, 1882
 Solaropsis serpens (Spix, 1827)
 Solaropsis trigonostoma Haas, 1934
 Solaropsis undata (Lightfoot, 1786)
 Solaropsis vipera (Pfeiffer, 1859)

Bradybaenidae (complete)
 Bradybaena similaris (Férussac, 1821)

Epiphragmophoridae (complete)
 Epiphragmophora bernardius
 Epiphragmophora semiclausa (Martens, 1868)

Helicidae (complete)
Cornu aspersum (O.F. Müller, 1774)

Bivalvia
116 species.

See also
 List of marine molluscs of Brazil

Lists of molluscs of surrounding countries:
 List of non-marine molluscs of Venezuela
 List of non-marine molluscs of Suriname
 List of non-marine molluscs of Guyana
 List of non-marine molluscs of French Guiana
 List of non-marine molluscs of Colombia
 List of non-marine molluscs of Bolivia
 List of non-marine molluscs of Peru
 List of non-marine molluscs of Argentina
 List of non-marine molluscs of Paraguay
 List of non-marine molluscs of Uruguay

References

Further reading
 Haas F. 1959. Inland mollusks from Venezuela, southern Brazil, and Peru. Fieldiana: Zoology, 39(31): 363–371.
 L. R. L. Simone (2006) Land and Freshwater Molluscs of Brazil. 390 pp.
 Agudo-Padrón A. I. (2009) "New malacological records from Paraná State, Southern Brazil region, with a general synthesys of current knowledge". Ellipsaria 11(1): 11–13.
 Agudo-Padrón A. I. (2009) "New malacological records from Paraná State, Southern Brazil Region. II. Supplementary Annex". Ellipsaria 11(2): 6–7.
 Agudo-Padrón A. I. (2009) "Endangered continental mollusks of Santa Catarina State, Southern Brazil: An Overview". Ellipsaria 11(2): 7–8.
 Agudo-Padrón A. I. (2009) "General mollusk fauna of Rio Grande do Sul State, Southernmost Brazil Region: a Preliminary Revision Rehearsal. II. New Bibliographical Records". Ellipsaria 11(2): 9–10.
 Agudo-Padrón A. I. (2011). "Mollusca and environmental conservation in Santa Catarina State (SC, Southern Brazil): current situation". Biodiversity Journal 2: 3–8. PDF.
 Agudo-Padrón A. I. (2011). "Current knowledge on population studies on five continental molluscs (Mollusca, Gastropoda et Bivalvia) of Santa Catarina State (SC, Central Southern Brazil region)". Biodiversity Journal 2: 9–12. PDF.
 Agudo-Padrón A. I. (2011). "Exotic molluscs in Santa Catarina’s State, Southern Brazil region (Mollusca, Gastropoda et Bivalvia): check list and regional spatial distribution knowledge". Biodiversity Journal 2: 53–58. PDF.
 Agudo-Padrón A. I. (2011). "Threatened freshwater and terrestrial molluscs of Santa Catarina State, Southern Brazil (Mollusca, Gastropoda et Bivalvia): check list and evaluation of regional threats". Biodiversity Journal 2: 59–66. PDF.

External links
 Conchasbrasil.org – Brazilian species of molluscs

Nonmarine molluscs
Molluscs, nonmarine
Brazil
Brazil
Brazil, Non
Brazil